John Spencer (born John Speshock Jr.; December 20, 1946 – December 16, 2005) was an American actor. He was best known for his role as Leo McGarry on the NBC political drama series The West Wing and for his role as attorney Tommy Mullaney in L.A. Law. His performance on The West Wing earned him a Primetime Emmy Award in 2002.

Early life
John Spencer was born John Speshock Jr., on December 20, 1946, in New York City, and was raised in Totowa, New Jersey. He was the son of blue-collar parents Mildred (née Benzeroski), a waitress, and John Speshock Sr., a truck driver. Spencer's father was of Irish and Czech descent, while his mother was of Ukrainian and Rusyn ancestry. Spencer’s parents were disappointed when he chose to become an actor. With his enrollment at the Professional Children's School in Manhattan in 1963, Spencer found himself sharing classes with such fellow students as Liza Minnelli and violinist Pinchas Zukerman. He attended Fairleigh Dickinson University, but did not complete a degree. Spencer often referred to himself as a "dyed-in-the-wool liberal" and described Franklin Delano Roosevelt as one of his heroes.

Career
Spencer began his television career on The Patty Duke Show, and eventually began appearing in supporting roles in feature films commencing with 1983's WarGames. He won an Obie Award for the 1981 off Broadway production of Still Life, about a Vietnam War veteran, and received a Drama Desk nomination for The Day Room. In 1986 he appeared on Broadway as Dan White, the killer of Harvey Milk, in Execution of Justice, alongside Stanley Tucci and Wesley Snipes. Spencer became a full-fledged supporting actor with the hit 1990 courtroom thriller Presumed Innocent, portraying a tough veteran homicide detective, starring opposite Harrison Ford. Spencer's work also extended to video games, portraying the role of Captain Hugh Paulsen in the 1995 video game Wing Commander IV: The Price of Freedom. Spencer's subsequent film and television work primarily consisted of supporting roles such as a colleague and friend to Billy Crystal's basketball ref in Forget Paris and a prickly FBI official in Michael Bay's film The Rock.

L.A. Law 
In 1990 Spencer joined the cast of the television series L.A. Law, playing street wise attorney Tommy Mullaney from 1990-1994. Spencer originally wasn't going to take the role but after reading 5 pages of the script he was convinced and said "it was one of the best scripts I’d read". Spencer said his character’s disheveled wardrobe was based on his own. Spencer said he and co star Cecil Hoffman spent time in New York City to prepare for the role.

The West Wing 
In 1999, Spencer was cast as Leo McGarry on the NBC political drama series The West Wing. Spencer's character was White House Chief of Staff to fictional U.S. President Josiah Bartlet. Like Spencer, McGarry was a recovering alcoholic and compulsive worker. McGarry's character was also a former US Air force pilot who served in the Vietnam War.

Spencer's character would later be chosen as Jimmy Smits' character's running mate. Spencer's role on the show earned him the Primetime Emmy Award for Outstanding Supporting Actor in a Drama Series in 2002, for the show's third season episodes "Bartlet for America" and "We Killed Yamamoto."

Personal life 
Spencer was married once and got divorced in the 1970s; he had no children.

Spencer quit drinking in 1989 after over 20 years of addiction to alcohol.

Death
Spencer died of a heart attack in a Los Angeles hospital on December 16, 2005, four days before his 59th birthday. At his private funeral, his West Wing castmate, Kristin Chenoweth, sang the musical number "For Good" from the Broadway musical Wicked. Spencer's remains were interred at Laurel Grove Memorial Park in his hometown of Totowa, New Jersey. 

Several paid tribute to him, including Martin Sheen, Dulé Hill, Joshua Malina, Janel Moloney, Richard Schiff, Alan Alda, Jimmy Smits, Aaron Sorkin, Allison Janney, James Mangold, David E. Kelley, and Bradley Whitford.

At the time of his death, Spencer had filmed two West Wing episodes that were in post-production – "Running Mates" and "The Cold" – in which he and Jimmy Smits played candidates for vice president and president, respectively.

Filmography

Film

Television

Video games

Awards

|-
|1981
|Still Life
|Obie Award
|
|- 
| rowspan="3"|2000
| rowspan="13"|The West Wing
|Viewers for Quality Television Award for Best Supporting Actor in a Quality Drama Series
|
|-
|Primetime Emmy Award for Outstanding Supporting Actor in a Drama Series
|
|-
|Screen Actors Guild Award for Outstanding Performance by an Ensemble in a Drama Series
|
|-
| rowspan="2"|2001
|Primetime Emmy Award for Outstanding Supporting Actor in a Drama Series
|
|-
|Screen Actors Guild Award for Outstanding Performance by an Ensemble in a Drama Series
|
|-
| rowspan="3"|2002
|Primetime Emmy Award for Outstanding Supporting Actor in a Drama Series
|
|-
|Screen Actors Guild Award for Outstanding Performance by an Ensemble in a Drama Series
|
|-
|Golden Globe Award for Best Supporting Actor – Series, Miniseries or Television Film
|
|-
| rowspan="2"|2003
|Primetime Emmy Award for Outstanding Supporting Actor in a Drama Series
|
|-
|Screen Actors Guild Award for Outstanding Performance by an Ensemble in a Drama Series
|
|-
| rowspan="2"|2004
|Primetime Emmy Award for Outstanding Supporting Actor in a Drama Series
|
|-
|Screen Actors Guild Award for Outstanding Performance by an Ensemble in a Drama Series
|
|-
|2005
|Screen Actors Guild Award for Outstanding Performance by an Ensemble in a Drama Series
|
|}

References

External links
 

1946 births
2005 deaths
20th-century American male actors
21st-century American male actors
Male actors from New Jersey
American male stage actors
American male television actors
American male film actors
American people of Irish descent
American people of Czech descent
American people of Rusyn descent
American people of Ukrainian descent
Outstanding Performance by a Supporting Actor in a Drama Series Primetime Emmy Award winners
California Democrats
Fairleigh Dickinson University alumni
Actors from Paterson, New Jersey
People from Totowa, New Jersey